Dian is a surname. Notable people with the surname include:

Diarmait Dian (died 689), an Irish king
Michal Dian (born 1981), Slovak footballer
Padmini Dian, Indian politician
Dian Wei (died 197), a general who served the Chinese warlord Cao Cao